Kin Ping Meh is a German rock band originally active from 1970 to 1977, and reformed in 2005. Their name is derived from Franz Kuhn's German translation of the Chinese novel Jin Ping Mei.

The band was founded in 1969 in Mannheim by Joachim Schäfer and Werner Stephan (original group was the school band "Thunderbirds").

The band was discovered by Polydor records in a competition of Bild am Sonntag on the Reeperbahn in 1970 and recorded the single Everything 's My Way / Woman and shortly after the second single, Alexandra / Everyday. In 1971, the first album was released and then in 2004 was re-released. It followed no. 2 album from 1972, and the third album appeared in 1973. The fourth album was Virtues and Sins of 1974, which also appeared in Argentina, namely as Virtudes y Pecados. The album cover was designed by graphic designer and photographer Günter Blum, who created the graphic for the double LP Concrete in 1976 as well.

In 1977 appeared the last LP, Kin Ping Meh.

There were also three compilations - 1973 Rock Sensations with recordings of the second and third LP, 1981 Rock in Germany Vol. 4 and 1991 Hazy on Stage on 180 grams vinyl, which contains live recordings 1971-1973.

A band member in the course of the band's leader was the guitarist Gagey Mrozeck, who later played for Herbert Grönemeyer and then worked as a music producer with artists such as Udo Lindenberg.

Other members were the keyboarder Chris Axel Klöber (born August 31, 1948), who had previously played with the Berlin band Curly Curve and Geff Harrison (born August 24, 1947), the former singer of Twenty Sixty Six and Then, who later started the Geff Harrison Band.

Personnel

Current
 Geff Harrison - lead vocals
 Gagey Mrozeck - guitar
 Alan "Joe" Wroe - bass guitar
 Frieder Schmitt - drums

Former
 Werner Stephan - lead vocals
 Michael Pozz - lead vocals
 Joachim Schafer - guitar, piano, backing vocals
 Fritz Schmitt - organ, piano
 Torsten Herzog - bass guitar
 Kalle Weber - drums

Albums
Kin Ping Meh (1971)
No. 2 (1972)	
III (1973)
Virtues And Sins (1974)
Concrete (1976)
Kin Ping Meh (1977)
Hazy Age On Stage (1991)

External links
 Retrospective article 
 More information of band and history

German progressive rock groups
Musical groups established in 1970
Krautrock musical groups